EeStairs is a designer and manufacturer of staircases and balustrades and inventor of the patented 1m2 staircase. EeStairs has offices in the UK, Europe and the USA. Its headquarters are located in the Netherlands.

History
Founded in 2000 as a construction company, EeStairs was originally named Cluistra RVS.  In the subsequent years the company specialized in staircase design and manufacturing and was renamed EeStairs. The founders of EeStairs are Dick Cluistra and Cornelis van Vlastuin

1m2 staircase
One of the products of EeStairs is the 1m2 staircase. It is a small staircase using only 1m2. EeStairs patented the 1m2 staircase in 2007.

Design competition
Since the year 2000 EeStairs organized a 'Staircase of the year' competition in The Netherlands. In 2014 EeStairs organized the first international design competition. The winners were architecture students from Russia and the Czech Republic.

References

Manufacturing companies of the Netherlands